This is a list of all lighthouses in the U.S. state of Mississippi as identified by the United States Coast Guard and other historical sources.

Only two of those listed remain standing, and neither holds a Coast Guard maintained light, though one is maintained privately. Three were replaced by unmanned lights at the same location.

Focal height and coordinates are taken from the 1907 United States Coast Guard Light List, while location and dates of activation, automation, and deactivation are taken from the United States Coast Guard Historical information site for lighthouses.

Notes
A. It is unclear whether this light was ever put in service.

References

Mississippi
 
Lighthouses
Lighthouses